Stuart James Ritchie is a Scottish psychologist and science communicator known for his research in human intelligence. He has served as a lecturer at the Institute of Psychiatry, Psychology and Neuroscience at King’s College London since the summer of 2018. He was previously active in researching intelligence as a postdoctoral researcher at the University of Edinburgh. In 2021, his book Science Fictions was nominated for the £25,000 Royal Society Prize for Science Books but lost out to Merlin Sheldrake's Entangled Life. Ritchie writes a newsletter titled Science Fictions for the newspaper i (on Substack prior to 2023) which, like his book of the same name, focuses on scientific controversies and bias and fraud in scientific research.

Publications
 Intelligence: All That Matters (2016, part of Teach Yourself's All That Matters series)
 Science Fictions: How Fraud, Bias, Negligence, and Hype Undermine the Search for Truth (2020)

References

External links
 Faculty page
 

Living people
Scottish psychologists
Intelligence researchers
Academics of King's College London
Alumni of the University of Edinburgh
Science communicators
Year of birth missing (living people)